See Risala (disambiguation) for other books known as "Ar-Risala".

The Risāla by  ash-Shafi'i (d. 820), full title Kitab ar-Risāla fī Uṣūl al-Fiqh ( "book of the communication on the foundations of  comprehension (i.e. Islamic jurisprudence)") is a seminal text on the principles of Islamic jurisprudence

The word risāla in Arabic means a "message" or "letter, communication". Shafi'i's treatise received its name owing to a traditional, though unverified, story that Shafi'i composed the work in response to a request from a leading traditionist in Basra, ‘Abd al-Raḥmān bin Mahdī; the story goes that Ibn Mahdī wanted Shafi'i to explain the legal significance of the Quran and the sunna, and the Risāla was Shafi'i's response.

In this work, al-Shafi'i is said to have outlined four sources of Islamic law, though this division based on four has been attributed to later commentators on the work rather than to Shafi'i himself.

Contents

 Introduction
 On al-Bayān (Perspicuous Declaration)
 On Legal Knowledge
 On the Book of God
 On the Obligation of Man to Accept the Authority of the Prophet
 On the Abrogation of Divine Legislation
 On Duties
 On the Nature of God's Orders of Prohibition and the Prophet's Orders of Prohibition
 On Traditions
 On Single-Individual Traditions
 On Consensus (Ijmā‘)
 On Analogy (Qiyās)
 On Personal Reasoning (Ijtihād)
 On Juristic Preference (Istiḥsān)
 On Disagreement (Ikhtilaf)

The above list of contents follows Khadduri's translation. However, Khadduri rearranged the treatise in two places. Khadduri's chapters 8 and 3 (in that order) both follow Shafi'i's chapter on Traditions in the original. Khadduri rearranged those chapters because they did "not appear to fit into the logical order of the book." Therefore, if one wishes to read Khadduri's translation while following Shafi'i's original arrangement, one can read the chapters in the following order: 1, 2, 4, 5, 6, 7, 9, 8, 3, 10, 11, 12, 13, 14, 15.

Sources of law in Al-Risāla
The primary sources of law attributed to Shafi'is book are the Qur'an and the prophetic tradition. Most Muslim commentators have also referred to Shafi'is sections on consensus and analogical reason as comprising legal sources.

On the question of consensus, Shafi'i obligated affirmation of all living Muslims - both the learned and the laymen - in order to declare a true consensus. Later followers of his school considered this to be practically impossible, and thus expanded upon the definition.

References 

Islamic jurisprudence
Sunni fiqh
Shafi'i
Books about Islamic jurisprudence
Sunni literature
Sharia